Highway 7 (AR 7, Ark. 7, Hwy. 7, and partially Scenic 7 Byway) is a north–south state highway that runs across the state of Arkansas. As Arkansas's longest state highway, the route runs  from Louisiana Highway 558 at the Louisiana state line north to Bull Shoals Lake at Diamond City near the Missouri state line. With the exception of the segment north of Harrison, Highway 7 has been designated as an Arkansas Scenic Byway and a National Forest Scenic Byway. The road passes through the heart of both the Ozark Mountains and the Ouachita Mountains, and features scenic views. It's the route favored by motorcycle riders touring the region.

Route description
AR 7 begins at the Louisiana state line near Lockhart, Louisiana. It runs north and meets US 63/US 167, which it forms a concurrency with until El Dorado. North of El Dorado AR 7 shoots a spur route named the Calion Cutoff. The route continues north to cross AR 335 before entering Smackover. Arkansas Highway 7 Business goes through downtown Smackover, while the main route runs around the town meeting AR 172. AR 7 continues northwest to enter Ouachita County. AR 7 runs roughly parallel to AR 376 until meeting the route south of Cullendale. The route continues north to Camden, when it intersects US 79/US 278 (formerly AR 4). AR 7 continues north through downtown and heads northwest to enter Dallas County.

AR 7 enters Dallas County near Ouachita and continues north to meet AR 208 in Sparkman. The route continues north to AR 8/Dalark. AR 7 runs west after meeting AR 8, leading into Clark County. AR 7/AR 8 runs to meet AR 51/AR 128 east of Arkadelphia. In Arkadelphia, AR 7 meets US 67, which it follows north to Caddo Valley and Interstate 30. After crossing I-30, AR continues north through DeGray Lake Resort State Park, now entering Hot Spring County, where it meets AR 84 in Bismarck.

Highway 7 enters Garland County by crossing over Lake Hamilton and crossing through the community of Lake Hamilton. AR 7 continues into Hot Springs, crossing US 70/US 270. The route enters Hot Springs National Park with AR 128. The route meets AR 298 north of Hot Springs Village, running with it until an area near the Perry County line. The route runs through the Ouachita National Forest until the Fourche Junction meeting with AR 60.

The route continues in Yell County by running through Ola. The route meets AR 10 and AR 28 in Ola. AR 7 continues northeast to Centerville, meeting AR 154 and AR 247. AR 7 also meets AR 115 before Dardanelle. The route turns right at Union Street in Dardanelle, entering Pope County. The route continues through Russellville, meeting US 64 (Main Street) and O Street before leaving town. AR 7 also meets I-40 north of Russellville. Continuing north, AR 7 meets AR 164 in Dover. In the Ozark National Forest, AR 7 meets AR 16 and AR 123 before entering Newton County.  AR 7 breaks north from AR 16 towards AR 74/Jasper. AR 7 crosses AR 206 upon entering Boone County. AR 7 enters Harrison, meeting AR 43, and having an officially designated exception over US 65 Business and US 62/US 65/US 412. It is after this point that the route is no longer designated scenic. The route continues to AR 14/Lead Hill before Diamond City, where the route terminates.

History

The route now known as Highway 7 first appears as a state maintained road in 1924, when the Arkansas General Assembly first created a federal aid system. Two main routes, State Road B-14 and State Road A-5 form a rough trail similar to the present-day Highway 7. Upon creation of the U.S. Route system in 1925, the north and south portions of the highway were replaced by U.S. Route 65 to Harrison and U.S. Route 167, respectively. Arkansas numbered its highways in 1926, and the route became Highway 7 (the north part of A-5 remains as Arkansas Highway 5).

Major intersections

Mile markers reset at concurrencies.

Auxiliary routes

Arkansas Highway 7 has six total auxiliary routes. AR 7 business in Smackover runs into town while the city is bypassed by the parent route. El Dorado, Hot Springs, and Russellville all have short spur routes serving as connectors. AR 7 Truck also serves as a bypass in Russellville, where AR 7S near Marble Falls serves former amusement park Dogpatch USA.

See also

 List of longest state highways in the United States

References

External links

007
Transportation in Union County, Arkansas
Transportation in Ouachita County, Arkansas
Transportation in Dallas County, Arkansas
Transportation in Clark County, Arkansas
Transportation in Hot Spring County, Arkansas
Transportation in Garland County, Arkansas
Transportation in Perry County, Arkansas
Transportation in Yell County, Arkansas
Transportation in Pope County, Arkansas
Transportation in Newton County, Arkansas
Transportation in Boone County, Arkansas
Ozark–St. Francis National Forest
U.S. Route 65